This is a list of bridges and viaducts in Finland, including those for pedestrians and vehicular traffic.

Historical and architectural interest bridges 
The museum roads and bridges was established by the Finnish Road Administration that belongs to the Finnish Transport Infrastructure Agency, in order to preserve the most historically valuable and representative parts of the road network as museum objects. There is a total of 22 roads and 37 bridges in the museum object collection.

Major road and railway bridges 
This table presents the structures with spans greater than 100 meters (non-exhaustive list).

Alphabetical list 
Bomarsund Bridge - Sund
Crusell Bridge - Helsinki
Erkkolan silta
Etelänkylän isosilta
Hakaniemen silta
Hämeensilta
Isoisänsilta
Jänhijoki railway bridge
Joutsensilta
Kaitaisten silta
Kallansillat
Kiskopolun silta
Kulosaaren silta
Kuokkala Bridge - Jyväskylä
Kärkisten silta
Kvarken Bridge
Lapinlahden silta
Laukan silta
Louhunsalmen riippusilta
 Martinsilta
 Myllysilta
 Möljä Bridge
Ounaskosken rautatie- ja maantiesilta
Pitkäsilta
Ponkilan silta
Porin silta
Replot Bridge
Sami Bridge
Sangin silta
Satakunnansilta
Savisilta
Sääksmäen silta
Tuiran sillat
Tähtiniemi Bridge
Ukkopekan silta
Vuolteensilta
Vuosaaren silta

Notes and references 
 

 

 Others references

See also 

 Transport in Finland
 Roads in Finland
 Highways in Finland
 Rail transport in Finland
 Geography of Finland
 List of rivers of Finland
 :fi:Museosilta  - Museum bridge

External links

Further reading 
 
 
 
 
 
 

Finland
 
Bridges
Bridges